The first case of the COVID-19 pandemic in the Indian capital of Delhi was reported on 2 March 2020. Delhi has the seventh-highest number of confirmed cases of COVID-19 in India. The total number of cases reported as of Apr 2022, is 1,867,572 consisting of 26,158 deaths and 1,840,342 who have recovered.

On 22 March, Delhi observed a 14-hour voluntary public curfew (the Janata curfew) along with 75 districts in India, at the directive of the Prime Minister. A nationwide lockdown was later issued for 21 days from 24 March.

Thousands of "stranded migrant workers" from Uttar Pradesh and Bihar gathered in the Anand Vihar Bus Station on 29 March 2020, trying to get back home after the nationwide lockdown was imposed. More than 3000 people from a religious gathering in the Nizamuddin Markaz Mosque (in the Nizamuddin West area) were quarantined after suspicions that they had come in contact with infected people. 1300 Tablighi Jamaat were part of this crowd, including foreigners in Markaz.

It was reported that air quality index of Delhi improved on 28 March 2020, after the lockdown had reduced traffic.
In April 2021, with cases increasing daily, CM Arvind Kejriwal announced a weekend curfew in Delhi every weekend. Notably, the traffic in the capital city decreased by a large amount.  On 19 April 2021, Delhi turned the weekend curfew to a week-long lockdown. The lockdown was extended several times - on April 25, May 2, May 9, May 15 until May 24 (as updated on May 19). Now lockdown is unlocked on 8 June.

Timeline 

The first case of COVID-19 in Delhi was confirmed on 2 March 2020 when a 45-year-old person from East Delhi, with a history of travel from Italy, tested positive for the coronavirus. A total of 92 people had been in contact with this person, 14 of which were from Delhi, and the remaining 74 were from other states. Out of these 14 in Delhi, two were symptomatic, but tested negative for COVID-19.
On 5 March 2020, the second victim, a 26-year-old Paytm employee from Uttam Nagar, West Delhi, tested positive, having recently traveled to Italy and France. His family members were asymptomatic, however. 91 contacts were found, out of which 18 contacts were from Delhi, and the remaining 73 from other regions
On 6 March 2020, three positive cases were reported from Uttam Nagar. 105 contacts were found for the first case, 95 for the second, and 11 for the third.
On 9 March 2020, 4 positive cases were reported. 76 contacts were found.
On 11 March 2020, a 46-year-old male who travelled to Japan, Geneva and Italy contracted the virus.
On 12 March 2020, a 69-year-old female was infected.
On 13 March 2020, the mother of the 46-year-old died. She was the second COVID-19 death in India. Also, a resident of Rajasthan and an evacuee from Italy was quarantined at Manesar Camp.
On 15 April 2021, Delhi Chief Minister Arvind Kejriwal announced a weekend curfew along with tight restrictions on weekdays in order to curb the second wave of COVID-19 infections.
On 17 April 2022, Delhi sees a rise in cases, but the positivity rate has relatively reduced from 5.33% to 4.21%

Tablighi Jamaat event

The Tablighi Jamaat wanted to meet in Vasai, Maharashtra, but an outbreak of COVID-19 caused them to relocate to Nizamuddin West. The Nizamuddin faction of the Tablighi Jamaat held the religious congregational program (Ijtema) in Nizamuddin West, Delhi. The Delhi Government's order that no seminars, conferences or any big event (beyond 200 people) should be held was ignored. Many foreign speakers violeted safety protocols, including misuse of tourist visa for missionary activities, and not quarantining for two weeks.

At least 24 of the attendees had tested positive for the virus among the 300 who showed symptoms by 31 March 2020. It is believed that the sources of infection were preachers from Indonesia. Many had returned to their states, and also provided refuge to foreign speakers without the knowledge of local governments. Eventually, local transmissions started, especially in Tamil Nadu, Telangana, Karnataka, Jammu and Kashmir and Assam. The entire Nizamuddin West was cordoned off by the Police as of 30 March, and medical camps were set up. 167 of the attendees were quarantined in a railway facility in southeast Delhi amid concerns over their safety and over transmission of the virus. The Tablighi Jamaat gathering emerged as one of India's major coronavirus hotspots, On 18 April 2020, Central Government of India said that 4,291 cases (or 29.8% of the 14,378 confirmed cases of COVID-19 in India) were linked to the Tablighi Jamaat, and these cases were spread across 23 states and Union Territories.

Questions have been raised as to how the Delhi Police allowed this event to proceed in the midst of a pandemic, while a similar event was prohibited in Mumbai by the Maharashtra Police. Once the COVID-19 lockdown came into effect in Delhi from 22 March onwards, the missionaries remaining in the Nizamuddin Markaz were trapped, and the functionaries began to seek assistance from the authorities for their evacuation.  Around 22,000 people that came in contact with the Tablighi Jamaat missionaries had to be quarantined.  On 31 March 2020, an FIR was filed against Muhammad Saad Kandhlawi and others by Delhi Police Crime Branch under Section 3 (penalty for offence) of the Epidemic Diseases Act, 1897 and Section 269 (negligent act likely to spread infection of disease), 270 (malignant act likely to spread infection of disease), 271 (disobedience to quarantine rule) and 120b (punishment of criminal conspiracy) of the IPC. On 8 April 2020, the Delhi Police traced Tablighi Jamaat leader Maulana Saad Kandhalvi in Zakirnagar in South-East Delhi, where he claimed to be under self-quarantine. Many other members of the missionary group have also been booked for allegedly helping spread the disease, including by hiding in mosques, a police official claimed. The Government of India has denied that it is singling out Muslims.

Government responses

Containment Strategy

March 
On 12 March 2020, the Delhi chief minister Arvind Kejriwal declared COVID-19 an epidemic in Delhi. This made the Epidemic Diseases Act, 1897 applicable to the territory. Schools, colleges and theatres were ordered to be closed until 31 March. Other public places, including offices and shopping malls were to be disinfected. Kejriwal also advised people to stay away from public gatherings.

On 13 March, the Indian Premier League matches were banned in Delhi, as were all sports gatherings. Conferences and seminars of more than 200 people were also banned. The deputy chief minister Manish Sisodia invoked the example of the religious superspreader in South Korea, and said that the Delhi government was determined to prevent such incidents.

On 16 March, the ban was strengthened to all gatherings over 50 people, including those for religious, social, cultural, political, academic, sports etc. reasons.

On 19 March, Kejriwal announced that all restaurants will be closed until March 31 in view of the ever increasing cases of coronavirus. He said that there will be a take-away system from restaurants and dine-in services would be closed. He also said that gatherings could not exceed 20 people. On 20 March, that number changed to 5 people. It was announced that all shops, industries, commercial establishments, and offices would remain closed.

Kejriwal announced that from 23 March to 31 March, all domestic/international flights arriving to Delhi would be suspended. By 22 March, he had announced a lockdown from 23 March at 6 a.m. to 31 March at midnight. All services barring essential services were closed due to the COVID-19 pandemic. Borders had been sealed except for transportation of essential services. On 24 March, the lockdown further extended until 14 April after PM Narendra Modi announced a complete nationwide lockdown, starting from March 24 at midnight for 21 days.

April 
On 14 April, Modi extended the lockdown until 3 May after recommendation from several state governments. On 19 April, CM Kejriwal announced that keeping in mind the current situation of Delhi, there would be no exemptions. By 28 April, the Delhi Government relaxed some restrictions in services such as health care, inter- and intrastate movement for health care staff (including by air if necessary), shelter homes (for senior citizens, poor people, women, disabled people), services for household needs like electrician, plumber etc., shops for electric fan and school books for areas not declared containment zones.

May 
On 4 May, the Ministry of Home Affairs announced the extension of lockdown from 4 May 2020, until 17 May 2020, at Delhi and declared all districts as red zone. Government and private offices were told to operate with 33% capacity, but government officers up to Deputy Secretary level would be able to work at 100%. Standalone liquor shops having L6 and L8 licences and those that sold tobacco products would be open from 4 May. Industrial activities in special economic zones, industrial estates and townships, all manufacturing units of essential goods, standalone shops in neighborhood would remain open. On 18 May, the Central Government extended lockdown until 31 May 2020. According to new guidelines, sports complexes and stadium would open for matches without spectators. Doctors, paramedics and nursing staff will have permission to cross the border without hassle since there were issues near the Haryana border. A nationwide curfew from 7 PM to 7 AM was also continued.

June 
On 1 June, lockdown phase 5/unlock phase 1 started, the former being that the Delhi border was sealed for one week (except for the persons related with essential services), and the latter being that shops, barber shops, and salons (except spas) would remain open every day without restrictions. The Central Government eased the nationwide curfew, reducing it to 9 PM to 5 AM, still including exceptions for persons involved in essential services. Also, the Central and State Government eased restrictions on two passengers in a car with driver and scooter without pillion rider.
Delhi government had initiated a disinfection drive in Delhi from 13 April 2020 On 4 April, CM Kejriwal announced that people who don't have ration cards could get free rations from fair price shops.

July 
By this time, Delhi had surpassed most of the states in India, with high case numbers for COVID-19 and a spike of around 2,000 cases per day. This made it difficult for the Delhi government to make further plans for reopening.

August

November 
After reaching the lowest recorded cases in October, doctors began to express concerns that the city could turn out to be the epicentre of India's first wave of winter infections, with cases by mid-November being the highest since COVID-19 began.

December 
On 31 December 2020 and 1 January 2021, curbs were placed preventing public gatherings at night for New Year's Eve.

Quarantine Strategy 
The Delhi government issued an order making a seven-day quarantine mandatory for all asymptomatic individuals arriving in the city via planes and trains. For symptomatic individuals, immediate COVID-19 testing on arrival, institutional quarantining until the result is out, moving to a hospital or a COVID-19 Care Center depending on symptoms if positive, and home isolation for 14 days in case of a negative result.

Sanitation Strategy 
RWAs undertook regular sanitization drives with the help of the civic bodies, enforced social distancing, distributed masks and reined in those who were repeatedly violating norms.

Immediate Relief 
On 23 March, the CM of Delhi had announced that 4 lakh people will get free food in Delhi from 24 March.

On 4 April, the Delhi Government had started to provide free food for 6.5 lakh people, including distressed migrant workers who were jobless in the current lockdown. To provide food across all areas of Delhi, and to maintain physical distance, hygiene and sanitation, the government had converted night shelters and schools into free food distribution centers.

On 5 April, it was reported that out of 71 lakh ration card holders in Delhi, 60% had received ration. As per the government until 5 April, 50,000 to 60,000 people who do not have ration cards, have applied for coupons to avail 5 kg of wheat, rice and sugar as free of cost. Some people complained about the distribution of rations in a video conference with area MLAs including other party. Kejriwal requested that they should reach out to people in distress and help them register to avail ration. The Delhi government started issuing e-coupons to those without ration cards as well.

On 21 April, since 38 lakh people who didn't have ration card applied for ration, the government announced it would provide free ration to 31 lakh people. Delhi CM conveyed that the government was providing half of the total population of Delhi free ration. On 21 April, as conveyed by CM Delhi, each MP, MLA of Delhi will get 2000 food coupons for their constituency to distribute to the poor who don't have any documents like ration card or Adhar card.

As one time financial help, Delhi govt had announced to support affected transport service providers like Auto, E-Rickshaw, rural transport vehicle and Gramin seva. They gave Delhi Rs 5,000/- each to those who applied with their current driving licence of para-transit vehicles and valid badge

Delhi CM had announced financial support of Rs 1 crore for the family of any deceased health staff who had died while dealing with coronavirus cases in Delhi. He had mentioned them as "not less than warrior" and this support as tribute to their noble service.

On 12 May, PM had announced a combined stimulus package of Rs 20 lakh crore to restore the economical condition of India due to the COVID-19 pandemic, which is, as per a UN economic expert, "impressive" and the largest package announced among developing countries.

Public Awareness Campaigns 
Delhi launched delhifightscorona.in, a website dedicated to COVID-19 related information. The website has details on containment zones and hotspots, testing facilities, key locations, e-pass procurement and relevant FAQs. It also includes locations of all grocery shops in Delhi, temporary relief centres and hunger relief centres.

Testing

On 13 April, in Delhi 14,036, COVID-19 testing had been done in which positive cases are 1,154 in total and percentage wise its 8.22%. Population of Delhi is 201,78,879 (20 million plus) falls under category of the states having population 11 to 37 million and until 13 April 2020, 696 test/million had been conducted in Delhi which is second highest after Kerala in this category.

On 21 April, the Delhi Govt. announced free COVID-19 test for media persons in Delhi after the incident of some journalists in Mumbai tested positive.

Treatment
13 April 2020, ICMR requested researcher to give a clinical trial on the critically ill patients of COVID-19 using convalescent plasma therapy.
15 April, after a meeting, the Lieutenant Governor of Delhi Anil Baijal had declared that Delhi may use the plasma technique to combat COVID-19. He mentioned that it will be on a trial basis with proper guidelines.
20 April, a 49-year-old critically ill patient of COVID-19 who was on ventilator support recovered after receiving plasma therapy. This is the first successful trial of plasma therapy in India.
24 April, as per feedback of CM Delhi, plasma therapy had been tried on 4 patients in LNJP hospital, with positive results. Two of them were expected to be released from the hospital very shortly. The Delhi Government was also seeking permission from the Central Government to apply this same therapy to all serious patients.
3 June, the Delhi Health Department ordered three hospitals in the national capital to provide 10 percent of their beds to COVID-19 patients of the Economically Weaker Sections (EWS) free of cost.
5 July, India's first plasma bank to treat COVID-19 patient had become operational at Delhi. Plasma bank set up was needed to have systematic donation from volunteers who have recently recovered from COVID-19 and fulfilled eligibility criteria.

Impact

Education 
As of 6 March 2020, all primary schools were closed by Delhi Govt until 31 March 2020.

Events not held 

On 6 March, in fear of COVID-19, the Fashion Design Council of India had postponed their show until further notice. The 2020 ISSF World Cup has been postponed which was scheduled to be held in May 2020. On 14 March 2020 Badminton World Federation (BWF) had also postponed their tournaments due to the same reason.

The National Commission for Protection of Child Rights asked organisations not to feed children on the road, as they were more susceptible to the virus outside, and instead requested that they were sent to the nearest shelter and received help.

Hotspot 

On 26 March 2020, Delhi Government had started declaring hotspot areas, starting from a few places in the Dilshad garden.
14 April, after adding eight new hotspots, there were 55 hotspots in Delhi.
15 April, after adding two more places, total hotspots reached 57.
19 April, 77 containment zones in total, and all 11 districts of Delhi were declared as hotspots as conveyed by Delhi CM
21 April, the number of containment zones rises to 87 
28 April, after adding two more places, total containment zones rises to 100.

The Delhi Government announced Operation SHIELD in order to curb the spread of the virus in the containment zones/hotspots. It is a six-layer plan, where 
S refers to sealing the immediate area,
H refers to home quarantine to all people living in the area,
I refers to isolation and contact tracing of people,
E refers to essential supply of commodities,
L refers to local sanitization and
D refers to door to door health check of people in the area.

The first success of the operation came from Dilshad Garden, an area where the virus was widely spread. The Delhi Government announced on 10 April 2020, that Operation SHIELD was successful in containing the spread of the virus in this area. The State Health Minister Satyendra Jain said that the area was virus-free after the implementation of the six layer operation. On 17 April, Deputy CM of Delhi, Manish Sisodia announced that the operation was also successful in two other hotspots, Vasundhara Enclave and Khichripur.

See also
 COVID-19 pandemic in India
 COVID-19 lockdown in India

Notes

References

External links 
 Govt site link for bed availability

Delhi
Delhi
2020s in Delhi
Health in Delhi
Disasters in Delhi
2020 in India
2021 in India